Raspberry vinegar is a drink made from raspberry juice, vinegar and sugar.

It is made by filling jars with raspberries, adding vinegar and leaving to stand for 8–10 days then pouring off all the liquid. This process is sometimes repeated several times with fresh fruit each time. Finally the liquid is boiled for 5 minutes with an equal weight of refined sugar.

It is used as with any concentrated squash and simply diluted with water.

See also 
Shrub (drink)

Fruit juice
Vinegar
Vinegar